Fred Chasan (April 4, 1924 – June 20, 2005) was an American medical doctor from Los Angeles, California and veteran of World War II. Chasan's house was one of several damaged or destroyed by a landslide on the cliffs beneath the property.

Early life and education 
Chasan was born April 4, 1924, in New York City to Morris and Pauline (née Philips) Chasan.

In 1942, Chasan graduated from the Bronx High School of Science and enrolled in the College of the City of New York majoring in biology for a Bachelor of Science degree. In parallel, he was a medical researcher at the Rockefeller Institute for Medical Research. 

After serving in the United States Army during World War II, Chasan resumed his university studies on the G.I. Bill at New York University, graduating in 1949 with a Bachelor of Arts degree in Biology and Chemistry. He then pursued a Master of Arts from NYU's School of Education.

In 1950, Chasan moved to Pasadena in Los Angeles, California for medical school, after which he went into private practice as a physician. While a medical student, Chasan was set up on a blind date with his future wife Roslyn and the couple married in January 1954.

The couple had three sons in the late 1950s and early 1960s, Mark, Jeff (father of Jake), and Paul.

Career 
Early in their marriage, Roslyn worked as a nurse in Chasan's medical practice.

In the early 1960s, Chasan's wife Roslyn proposed becoming a lawyer, to which Chasan is said to have remarked, "You helped me thought medical school – now I will help you [through law school]."

By 1968 Chasan had become the chief of staff to the Memorial Hospital of Gardena, and was named medical director in 1977.

House collapse 
Chasan and his wife Roslyn built a large Mediterranean-style villa in Palos Verdes Estates, California in the late 1970s. The house was built atop scenic cliffs with a panoramic view of the Pacific Ocean on Paseo del Mar.

In the early 1980s, the aging city-owned storm drain system fell into a state of disrepair and after a California Water Service Company water main broke, a landslide destabilized the cliffs supporting the house's foundation. The family was forced to evacuate the house in 1981 and within two years the remaining portions of the property had either been demolished or fallen into the sea. A jury found the city was negligent in their duties to maintain the storm drain system and the city settled the case.

Later years and death 
In the aftermath of the collapse of the villa, Chasan and Roslyn moved to Manhattan Beach, California, away from the Los Angeles peninsula. After retiring from private medical practice, the couple moved to Rancho Santa Fe, California in the late 1980s and he rejoined the United States Military as a Medical Officer in the Navy working as a physician at Naval Medical Center San Diego.

Chasan died on June 20, 2005, and was buried at Fort Rosecrans National Cemetery.

References 

1924 births
2005 deaths
American physicians
American surgeons
Palos Verdes Peninsula
Survivors of the September 11 attacks
New York University people
City College of New York people